The Boys is an American media franchise, consisting of action-drama/satirical black comedy superhero streaming television series which follow the residents of a world where superpowered individuals called Supes are recognized as heroes by the general public and work for a powerful corporation known as Vought International, which markets, monetizes, and (secretly) creates them, with most being selfish and corrupt outside of their heroic personas. Based on the comic book series of the same name by Garth Ennis and Darick Robertson, originally published by DC Comics under its Wildstorm imprint before moving to Dynamite Entertainment, the television franchise debut has garnered success both financially and critically.

The first season of The Boys, developed by Eric Kripke with executive producers Seth Rogen and Evan Goldberg, was released in July 2019, with an ensemble cast led by Jack Quaid, Erin Moriarty, Karl Urban, and Antony Starr. A second season, with Colby Minifie and Aya Cash, was released from September to October 2020, while a third season, with Claudia Doumit and Jensen Ackles, was released from June to July 2022, with an animated spin-off anthology series, The Boys Presents: Diabolical, releasing in March 2022, and an Audible podcast, The Boys: Deeper and Deeper, starring Chace Crawford, Katy Breier, and Leigh Bush, releasing in June 2022. The series were released via Amazon Prime Video, while the promotional web series VNN: Seven on 7 with Cameron Coleman and sponsored promotional episodes of Death Battle! were released via YouTube from 2020 to 2022.

The franchise is to continue with a live-action spin-off series, Gen V, starring Lizze Broadway and Jaz Sinclair and centered around the franchise's young adult Supes, with a fourth season of The Boys also being in development.

Origin

The Boys television franchise is based on the comic series of the same name, which was originally published by WildStorm (DC Comics) from October 2006 to January 2007, before being cancelled and moved to Dynamite Entertainment, where it was published from February 2007 until November 2012. Several spin-offs of the series were published by Dynamite during the latter run, initially known simply as Herogasm, Highland Laddie, and Butcher, Baker, Candlestickmaker, before being rebranded as regular volumes of The Boys for the series' omnibus re-release. The series was created by Garth Ennis and Darick Robertson. Following the launch of the television adaptation for Amazon Prime Video by Eric Kripke, an eight-issue epilogue series to The Boys comic series, Dear Becky, was published from June to November 2020. All 98 issues of the series have been faithfully adapted into 7 full cast audiobooks produced by GraphicAudio beginning in May 2020. All volumes are a combined 31 hours in length.

Television series

The Boys (2019–present)

The first television series, The Boys, follows the eponymous team of vigilantes as they combat super-powered individuals who abuse their abilities. At the start of the series, Hughie Campbell is recruited to the Boys by Billy Butcher after the former's girlfriend Robin is accidentally killed by the speedster A-Train, while elsewhere, the superhero group known as the Seven are joined by Annie January, a young and hopeful heroine forced to face the truth about those she admires. As Butcher comes to odds with the Seven's unstable and violent leader, the Homelander, the two independently face the forces of Vought International executive Madelyn Stillwell and CEO Stan Edgar, as well as Edgar's daughter Victoria Neuman, and Homelander's father, Soldier Boy.

The concept of a The Boys adaptation originated when Columbia Pictures optioned the then-ongoing comic for a film adaptation in February 2008, to be produced by Neal H. Moritz. and Phil Hay and Matt Manfredi writing the screenplay. In August 2010, Adam McKay said that he had been signed on to direct the film. McKay added, "They already have a script and we're doing a rewrite on it so hopefully getting the whole thing into shape in the Fall with maybe a shoot happening in January." Columbia Pictures reported in February 2012 that it had dropped its option regarding a film adaptation of The Boys. However, Adam McKay said in a Twitter response that Paramount Pictures had picked it up, and that it was still in the works. On April 30, 2013, Manfredi and Hay were hired by Paramount to write the film, only for the project to enter development hell.

In October 2015, it was reported that Cinemax had greenlit a television series adaptation of The Boys, and that Seth Rogen, Evan Goldberg and Eric Kripke were producing the series. In September 2017, Variety reported that Amazon Studios had picked up the series. The first season premiered on July 26, 2019, with a second season (also adapting Butcher, Baker, Candlestickmaker) premiering on September 4, 2020, and a third season (also adapting Herogasm) premiering on June 3, 2022. A fourth season of The Boys is in development.

Diabolical (2022)

On December 5, 2021, at the Brazil Comic-Con, Amazon Prime Video announced that The Boys Presents: Diabolical, an animated anthology series spin-off of The Boys, had been given an eight-episode series order. On January 18, 2022, it was announced that the series' first season would premiere in-full on March 4, 2022.

Gen V

The third television series, Gen V, follows young adult Supes as they are tested in The Hunger Games-style challenges at the Godolkin University School of Crimefighting, run by Vought International.

On September 24, 2020, it was announced that a spin-off centered on a superhero college had been fast-tracked into development upon the ratings success of the second season of The Boys. Described as being "part college show, part Hunger Games", the spin-off is to be set "...at America's only college exclusively for young adult superheroes (and run by Vought International)" and is described as "an irreverent, R-rated series that explores the lives of hormonal, competitive Supes as they put their physical, sexual, and moral boundaries to the test, competing for the best contracts in the best cities". On October 2, 2020, Kripke stated the series would focus on the G-Men team that had been mentioned in the first season, a parody of the X-Men, loosely adapting "We Gotta Go Now", the fourth volume of The Boys comic book series. In March 2021, Lizze Broadway, Jaz Sinclair, Shane Paul McGhie, Aimee Carrero, and Maddie Phillips were cast to star. On April 15, 2021, Reina Hardesty joined the main cast. On September 27, 2021, the untitled spin-off was given a series order by Amazon Studios. On March 10, 2022, Carrero and McGhie exited the series. A few days later, Chance Perdomo joined the main cast in a recasting, replacing McGhie. On April 25, 2022, Hardesty left the series. On May 9, 2022, London Thor was cast to replace Hardesty. Derek Luh, Asa Germann, and Shelley Conn also joined the cast as series regulars. Two days later, Patrick Schwarzenegger, Sean Patrick Thomas, and Marco Pigossi were cast in recurring capacities, with the filming of the series, titled Gen V, beginning at the University of Toronto in May 2022 and the Claireville Conservation Area, Brampton in July, intended for an October wrap. In July 2022, it was announced that the series would officially be titled Gen V.

Short films

Butcher (2020)
A companion short film titled , set between the first and second seasons of The Boys, was released to Twitter on September 10, 2020, with Karl Urban reprising his role as Billy Butcher. Set in the aftermath of "You Found Me", the film follows Butcher as he evades the authorities after being framed for Madelyn Stillwell's murder, and reaches out to Jock (portrayed by David S. Lee), an old friend of his from the Royal Marine Commandoes.

Mr. Butcher (2022)
A second short film,  was released to Twitter on September 9, 2022, with Urban again reprising his role. Set in the aftermath of the third season, the film follows Butcher as he visits an elementary school as a guest speaker, in order to teach children to fear and be wary of Supes, in particular Homelander and his new Seven, and of what can be done to combat them.

Web series

Death Battle! (2020–present)

From 2015, Rooster Teeth began to host the 2010 web series Death Battle!, in which pop culture icons would be pit against each other in a fight to the death and determine who would win and who would die based on research of the characters (notable examples include Optimus Prime against the RX-78 2 Gundam, RoboCop against the T-800 Terminator, and the Megazord against Voltron, amongst many others), using various distinctive animation styles (using 2D pixelated graphics, 3D computer-generated animation models or 2D traditionally animated rigs), and very rarely—live-action. Originally sponsored by Netflix (prior to the launch of the company's streaming service), hosted by Wizard, a.k.a. "Wiz" (voiced by series creator Ben B. Singer), a mad scientist with a robotic arm, and Boomstick (voiced by Chad James), an alcoholic country man with a shotgun for a leg, other content would animated fight shows without research called DBX (primarily hosted by Marshall, a.k.a. "Ringmaster" (voiced by Billy B. Burson III), a podcast, Death Battle Cast, and an informative show, Desk of Death Battle, hosted by Jocelyn the Intern (voiced by Lisa Foiles).

Following the rebranding of the parent YouTube channel ScrewAttack as "Death Battle" after the series on February 4, 2019, Amazon Prime Video sponsored two promotional episodes of the series in 2020 to promote the second season of The Boys, featuring the series' superhero group the Seven partake in a battle royale (with Billy Butcher), with The Boys character Black Noir joining as a guest host: Nathan Mitchell reprising his role from the live-action series, and impersonator voice actors voicing other characters from the series. Following these episodes, Noir became a reoccurring supporting character in the Death Battle! series, with a further promotional episode pitting Homelander (with Yong Yea reprising his role from the first sponsored Death Battle!) against Omni-Man from Invincible (another superhero series by Amazon Prime Video) being produced in 2022.

Seven on 7 (2021–present)

Following the delay of the third season of The Boys due to the COVID-19 pandemic, Prime Video began releasing video segments in the form of in-universe news reports from the Vought News Network channel on YouTube, of the in-universe series VNN: Seven on 7 with Cameron Coleman. Each of the seven segments contains seven stories that tease events in upcoming episodes and introduce new cast members, and acts as a bridge between Season 2 and 3. Matthew Edison, who plays news anchor Cameron Coleman, also later appeared in the third season of The Boys.

Podcast

(2022)
On June 8, 2022, Amazon subsidiary and audio storytelling division Audible announced a The Boys spin-off Audible Original podcast, titled , to have been secretly produced, to release the following day, June 9. Written by Matt Burns, directed by Chris Sacco, and starring Chace Crawford and Katy Breier, reprising their roles from the television series as Kevin "The Deep" Moskowitz and his wife Cassandra Schwartz, the series follows the couple as they sit down for a "no-holds-barred podcast interview" about their relationship and escape from the Church of the Collective, and about their recent memoir and film adaptation about as such. Leigh Bush, who plays the couple's interviewer Hailey Miller, also later appeared in the third season of The Boys. The podcast has received a positive critical reception.

Recurring cast and characters

Production

Development
Between 2008 and 2016, a film adaptation of The Boys had been in various stages of development at both Columbia Pictures and Paramount Pictures. Adam McKay expressed interest in directing, and Matt Manfredi and Phil Hay were in charge of the screenplay. McKay expressed interest in casting Russell Crowe as Billy Butcher and Simon Pegg as Hughie, as well as shooting the film in 3D. On April 6, 2016, it was announced that Cinemax was developing a television series adaptation of the comic book. The production was being developed by Eric Kripke, Evan Goldberg, and Seth Rogen. Kripke was set to write the series while Goldberg and Rogen were set to direct. Executive producers were reported to include Kripke, Goldberg, Rogen, Neal H. Moritz, Pavun Shetty, Ori Marmur, James Weaver, Ken Levin, and Jason Netter. Garth Ennis and Darick Robertson were set as co-executive producers. Production companies involved with the series included Point Grey Pictures, Original Film, and Sony Pictures Television.

On November 8, 2017, it was announced that Amazon had given the production a series order for a first season consisting of eight episodes. The series had reportedly been in development at Amazon for a number of months preceding the series order announcement. It was also reported that the previously announced creative team was still attached to the series. Kripke wanted to retain a sense of reality to the show, and to keep the writers disciplined decided "Anything that comes out of this drug is viable, and anything that doesn't we're not allowed to do". He did not want to fall into the overused convention of killing off female characters to motivate the heroes and also saw an opportunity to surprise readers of the comics by changing the story of Butcher's wife Becky. On April 30, 2018, it was announced that Dan Trachtenberg would direct the series' first episode, replacing Rogen and Goldberg, who dropped out due to scheduling conflicts.

Ahead of the series premiere, on July 19, 2019, at the 2019 San Diego Comic-Con, it was announced that Amazon had renewed the series for a second season, which premiered on September 4, 2020. It was also confirmed that the second season would consist of eight episodes, like the previous season. Kripke confirmed that he was already starting to write the scripts just before the series premiere revealing that it took "a lot of tiptoeing around expectations for the hit's sophomore outing". The eight scripts for the second season were completed by November 2019. The season explore issues like white nationalism, white supremacy, systemic racism, and xenophobia which Kripke saw this as an opportunity to introduce Stormfront due to the character being racist superhero who also supports the Nazism. Kripke revealed that unlike the comics were Stormfront is male, the character would be gender swapped for the series with the intention of creating "Homelander’s worst nightmare that would be a strong woman who wasn’t afraid of him and proceeded to steal his spotlight."

Ahead of the second-season premiere, on July 23, 2020, Amazon renewed the series for a third season at the aftershow hosted by Aisha Tyler for the 2020 San Diego Comic-Con@Home. The third season began filming in early 2021 with an unknown release date. On October 30, 2020, Kripke revealed that the third season would adapt the miniseries comic book Herogasm, which is centered around superhero orgy festivals. It would be adapted for the season's sixth episode, which would be named "Herogasm" after the miniseries. Kripke stated that "Herogasm" had "the craziest dailies he [had] ever seen" and "that people [were] not ready to watch it". However, while "Herogasm" would be adapted, the series' Soldier Boy would be based on the World War II-era "Homelander before Homelander", rather than the incompetent modern-day successor from the comic series. 

At the 2021 CCXP Worlds panel for Prime Video in Brazil, a spin-off animated anthology series of the Boys was announced, titled The Boys Presents: Diabolical and likened by executive producers Seth Rogen and Evan Goldberg to The Animatrix. Diabolical is made up of eight brand new stories created by Awkwafina, Garth Ennis, Eliot Glazer and Ilana Glazer, Evan Goldberg and Seth Rogen, Simon Racioppa, Justin Roiland and Ben Bayouth, Andy Samberg, and Aisha Tyler. The series premiered on March 4, 2022. Eric Kripke stated that the idea to create Diabolical arose during the COVID-19 pandemic, when the producers wanted to release something during the wait for season three of The Boys.  Due to the restrictions on most live-action productions, they decided to try and make an animated anthology utilizing different forms and styles. Several key cast members were revealed with the first teaser trailer in February 2022, which included several of the creators. Later that month, a full trailer with the rest of the large cast was revealed. This included the revelation that Pegg would provide the voice of Hughie Campbell, a character who was long associated with Pegg; however, Pegg could not portray him in live action, having aged too much by the time the series was produced.

On September 20, 2020, a live-action spin-off of The Boys, initially titled The Boys Presents: Varsity and later retitled Gen V, was announced, with Craig Rosenberg writing and executive producing the series with Eric Kripke, Seth Rogen, Evan Goldberg, James Weaver, Neal H. Moritz, Pavun Shetty, Michaela Starr, Garth Ennis, Darick Robertson, Sarah Carbiener, Erica Rosbe, Aisha Porter-Christie, Judalina Neira, and Zak Schwartz. On September 27, 2021, Amazon gave the order for the series and Michele Fazekas and Tara Butters were set as showrunners and executive producers of the series. On October 2, 2020, Kripke stated Hunger Games-inspired series would focus on the G-Men team, originally created as a parody of Marvel Comics' X-Men, who were first mentioned in the first season of The Boys and said via ticker tape in the second season to be undergoing a version of the #MeToo movement called "#G-Too".

On June 10, 2022, Amazon renewed The Boys for a fourth season.

Reception

Critical response

Accolades

Music
Score albums were released for every season of The Boys. Christopher Lennertz served as composer of the show's score. During an interview at the 2019 Comic-Con, he stated that his work for The Boys was the "craziest thing" he has ever done, after collaborating with Seth Rogen for Sausage Party. On July 22, 2019, Slipknot released a new single called "Solway Firth" with an accompanying music video which featured clips and audio from the show.

For the second season's soundtrack, Erin Moriarty provides her own vocals for the song "Never Truly Vanish", which was nominated for an Emmy. The music video for "Never Truly Vanish" was released on YouTube on June 4, 2021. Jessie T. Usher also performed an original song for the second season's soundtrack and on September 1, 2021, the music video for "Faster" was released on YouTube. The third season's soundtrack included two songs performed by Miles Gaston Villanueva being "You’ve Got a License to Drive (Me Crazy)" and "Rock My Kiss", while Laurie Holden performed "America’s Son" which were released on June 3, 2022. On June 17, 2022, a video for another song performed by Holden was "Chimps Don't Cry."

Оther media

SupePorn
On October 3, 2020, Eric Kripke said that the in-universe pornographic superhero film scenes briefly glimpsed in the second season The Boys episode "Butcher, Baker, Candlestick Maker" had been produced in full, expressing interest in releasing them under the name Supe Porn to the website of the same name, registered to Sony Pictures, as well as supposedly requesting Seth Rogen, Evan Goldberg, Antony Starr and the other followers of his Twitter page to join him in petitioning Prime Video and Amazon Studios to allow the potential web series to be uploaded.

Following the airing of the third season episode "Glorious Five Year Plan", SupePorn.com was turned into a fictional sex toy online store where the Supe-themed dildos seen in the episode could be bought, before SupePorn.com was featured on the following episode, "The Last Time to Look on This World of Lies", as the site Crimson Countess used to host her cam girl business. At the bottom of the website there is a message saying that its contents are for entertainment purpose only and not actually for sale.

Video games
In June 2021, it was announced that a tie-in video game of The Boys was in early development.

Marketing
Funko released Pop! Vinyl figures of Queen Maeve, A-Train, Billy Butcher, Hughie Campbell, Starlight, Homelander and Translucent in 2020, and the Deep in 2022.

Notes

References

 
Mass media franchises introduced in 2019
Amazon (company) franchises
Amazon Prime Video original programming
DC Comics dimensions
Dynamite Entertainment adaptations
Science fiction franchises
Sony Pictures franchises
Superhero franchises
Television franchises